Mark Christopher Scarsi (born December 23, 1964) is an American lawyer and jurist who serves as a U.S. district judge of the U.S. District Court for the Central District of California.

Early life, education, and career 

Scarsi was born in 1964 in Syracuse, New York. He studied computer science at Syracuse University, graduating in 1987 with a Bachelor of Science. From 1987 to 1993, Scarsi worked as a software engineer for GE Aviation and Lockheed Martin, designing and developing detection and signal processing computer systems for U.S. defense applications. He also did graduate study in computer science at Syracuse, receiving a Master of Science in 1993. He then attended Georgetown University Law Center, graduating in 1996 with a Juris Doctor, magna cum laude, and Order of the Coif honors.

Legal career 
After graduating from law school, Scarsi was in private practice at the Los Angeles-based intellectual property law firm Christie, Parker & Hale (now part of Lewis Roca Rothgerber Christie) from 1996 to 1998. From 1998 to 2007, Scarsi was in practice at O'Melveny & Myers, becoming a partner in 2003. In 2007, he joined Milbank, Tweed, Hadley & McCloy, where he served as the Chair of the firm's Global Intellectual Property Practice and as the Los Angeles office's managing partner.

Federal judicial service 

On October 10, 2018, President Donald Trump announced his intent to nominate Scarsi to serve as a United States district judge of the United States District Court for the Central District of California. On November 13, 2018, his nomination was sent to the Senate. President Trump nominated Scarsi to the seat vacated by Judge George H. King, who retired on January 6, 2017.

On January 3, 2019, his nomination was returned to the President under Rule XXXI, Paragraph 6 of the United States Senate. On January 30, 2019, President Trump announced his intent to renominate Scarsi to the district court. On February 6, 2019, his nomination was sent to the Senate. A hearing on his nomination before the Senate Judiciary Committee was held on November 13, 2019. On January 3, 2020, his nomination was once again returned to the President under Rule XXXI, Paragraph 6 of the United States Senate. On January 9, 2020, he was renominated to the same seat. On March 5, 2020, his nomination was reported out of committee by voice vote. On September 14, 2020, the Senate invoked cloture on his nomination by a 77–12 vote. On September 15, 2020, his nomination was confirmed by a 83–12 vote. He received his judicial commission on September 18, 2020.

References

External links 
 

1964 births
Living people
20th-century American lawyers
21st-century American lawyers
21st-century American judges
California lawyers
California Republicans
Federalist Society members
Georgetown University Law Center alumni
Judges of the United States District Court for the Central District of California
People associated with Milbank, Tweed, Hadley & McCloy
People from Syracuse, New York
Syracuse University alumni
United States district court judges appointed by Donald Trump